Õnne 13 is an Estonian dramatic TV series that airs on ETV. The series first aired on 30 October 1993 and was written by Astrid Reinla and as of 1996 by Teet Kallas. Since 1997, the series is produced by BEC (Baltic Video OÜ), which has also produced Pehmed ja Karvased, Kodu Keset Linna, and Ohtlik Lend.

The series takes place in the fictional town of Morna and features an ensemble cast.

Cast

Viewership

1 Position in Estonia's viewership.
2 <small>Percentage of total Estonian viewership watching.</small>From TNS Emor's Estonian TV polling.

References

External links

Estonian television series
1993 Estonian television series debuts
1990s Estonian television series
2000s Estonian television series
2010s Estonian television series
1993 establishments in Estonia
Eesti Televisioon original programming